The Jack Oughton House near Shoshone, Idaho was begun during the 1920s and completed in 1931 by stonemasons Jack Oughton and his partner Sandy Reed.  It was listed on the National Register of Historic Places in 1983.

It has windows and a front door with concrete lintels. Its architecture seems to reflect Bungalow architecture as well as other influence.

It was deemed significant as an example of vernacular architecture and for association with Jack Oughton, who worked as a stonemason around Shoshone for more than three decades, and whose home it was.

References

Houses on the National Register of Historic Places in Idaho
Houses completed in 1931
Houses in Lincoln County, Idaho
National Register of Historic Places in Lincoln County, Idaho